Winklevoss twins refers collectively to:

 Cameron Winklevoss (born 1981), American investor, rower, and entrepreneur
 Tyler Winklevoss (born 1981), American investor, rower, and entrepreneur